María Berrío (born 1982) is a Colombian-born visual artist working in Brooklyn, New York. The LA Times wrote that Berrío's large-scale collage works, "meticulously crafted from layers of Japanese paper, reflect on cross-cultural connections and global migration seen through the prism of her own history." She is known for her use of Japanese print paper, which she cuts and tears to create collages with details painted in with watercolour. Berrío, who spent her childhood in Colombia and moved to the US in her teens, draws from Colombian folklore and South American literature. In her interview with The Georgia Review in 2019, the artist discusses the tradition of aluna of the Kogi people in her work Aluna (2017). Berrío's collages are characterised by representations of mainly women, who often stare back at the viewer.

Career
Her work is included in the collections of the Pérez Art Museum Miami, the Yuz Museum Shanghai, the Pennsylvania Academy of Fine Arts, the National Gallery of Art, and the Whitney Museum of American Art. In 2021, Berrío was awarded the Joan Mitchell Fellowship from the Joan Mitchell Foundation. Berrío's work was included in the 2022 exhibition Women Painting Women at the Modern Art Museum of Fort Worth.

References

1982 births
Living people
21st-century Colombian women artists
People from Bogotá